Fireside Dinner Theater is a historic dinner theater and special events venue in Fort Atkinson, Wisconsin. The original building and several expansions were designed by Fort Atkinson-based architect Helmut Ajango, who also designed The Gobbler, and built in 1964. A nearby building was purchased for conversion into a theater and added to the complex. The business is run by the Klopcic family.

Stage Productions

References

External links
Fireside Theatre website

Buildings and structures in Jefferson County, Wisconsin
Theatres in Wisconsin